Markkleeberger See is a lake in Saxony, Germany, next to Markkleeberg, a suburb on the south side of Leipzig. At an elevation of 112.5 m, its surface area is 2.52 km2.  It is a former open-pit coal mine, flooded in 1999 with groundwater and developed in 2006 as a tourist area.  On its southeastern shore is Germany's only pump-powered artificial whitewater slalom course, the Kanupark Markkleeberg. The lake is a part of the Central German Lake District.

Lakes of Saxony
Markkleeberg